Gottfried Reinhardt (20 March 1913 – 19 July 1994) was an Austrian-born American film director and producer.

Biography
Reinhardt was born in Berlin, the son of the Austrian theater director Max Reinhardt (until 1904: Max Goldmann), manager of the Deutsches Theater, and his first wife Else Heims. Gottfried attended the Französisches Gymnasium Berlin and began his career as an actor and director at his father's stage.

In 1932, he went on a study visit to the US, where he remained after the Nazi Machtergreifung in Germany on 30 January 1933. In Hollywood, he became assistant director of Ernst Lubitsch, later a production assistant at the Metro-Goldwyn-Mayer studios, contributing to the making of the 1938 film The Great Waltz. In 1941 he produced Two-Faced Woman starring Greta Garbo in her final film role. A naturalized American, he served in the United States Army in World War II.

Reinhardt gave his debut as a director with Invitation in 1952. Two years later he worked in West Germany; his film version Before Sundown of Gerhart Hauptmann's drama Vor Sonnenuntergang starring Hans Albers won the Golden Bear (Audience award) at the 6th Berlin International Film Festival.

Gottfried Reinhardt was the stepfather of U.S. federal judge Stephen Reinhardt. He died of pancreatic cancer.

Selected filmography
 The Great Waltz (1938, writer)
 Bridal Suite (1939, writer)
 Two-Faced Woman (1941, producer)
 The Red Badge of Courage (1951, producer)
 Invitation (1952)
 Young Man with Ideas (1952, producer)
 The Story of Three Loves (1953)
 Betrayed (1954)
 Before Sundown (1956)
 Menschen im Hotel (1959)
 Abschied von den Wolken (1959)
 Sweetheart of the Gods (1960)
 Town Without Pity (1961)
 Jedermann (1961)
 Eleven Years and One Day (1963)
 Situation Hopeless ... But Not Serious (1965)
 Der Kommissar: Im Jagdhaus (1974, TV series episode)

References

External links

1911 births
1994 deaths
English-language film directors
American film directors
Jewish emigrants from Nazi Germany to the United States
Französisches Gymnasium Berlin alumni
People from Hollywood, Los Angeles
United States Army soldiers
Military personnel from California
United States Army personnel of World War II
Naturalized citizens of the United States
Deaths from cancer in California
Deaths from pancreatic cancer
American film producers